Manmohini Sahgal (née Zutshi, 1909–1994) was an Indian freedom fighter and politician. She was a member of the Nehru–Gandhi family.

Biography 

Her father was a nephew to Motilal Nehru, and she was therefore Jawaharlal Nehru's first cousin once removed. She was born and grew up in Motilal Nehru's home in Allahabad. As many others in the family, she was an active participant in India's struggle for independence. A leader in student politics during her college years, Sahgal followed her mother and sisters in brief prison terms for demonstrating against the British Raj. Between 1930 and 1935, Sahgal finished college, became a teacher and was a member of the revolutionary Indian National Congress. In 1935, she married a government bureaucrat and, she explains, had to give up politics as well as active association with her old friends. In her autobiography she describes following her husband to various posts, supervising a growing household. Sahgal joined various ladies clubs and volunteer welfare organizations: as a member of the Catering Advisory Committee for the North Eastern Railway, she investigated charges against crooked vendors at train stations. She made an unsuccessful run for public office.

Autobiography

References

Indian National Congress politicians from Uttar Pradesh
Indian independence activists from Uttar Pradesh
Nehru–Gandhi family
Women in Uttar Pradesh politics
1909 births
1994 deaths
Politicians from Allahabad
Women Indian independence activists
20th-century Indian women
20th-century Indian people
20th-century Indian women politicians
20th-century Indian politicians